Hurricane Gilma was one of the most intense Pacific hurricanes on record and the second of three Category 5 hurricanes during the active 1994 Pacific hurricane season. Developing from a westward tracking tropical wave over the open waters of the eastern Pacific Ocean on July 21, the pre-Gilma tropical depression was initially large and disorganized. Gradual development took place over the following day before rapid intensification began. By July 23, the storm intensified into a hurricane and later a Category 5 storm on July 24. As Gilma reached this intensity, it crossed into the Central Pacific basin, the fourth consecutive storm to do so.

The following day, unknown factors caused the storm to suddenly weaken before increasing wind shear took over. The storm gradually weakened for the duration of its existence, turning slowly to the northwest. Late on July 28, the storm brushed Johnston Atoll, bringing gusty winds and light rainfall to the region. Gilma persisted until July 31 at which time it was downgraded to a tropical depression and dissipated over open waters.

Meteorological history

Hurricane Gilma originated from a tropical wave that moved off the coast of Africa and traversed the Atlantic Ocean during the second week of July 1994. The wave was of little note until it crossed Central America and entered the Northeastern Pacific hurricane basin on July 15–16. Convection began to increase; however, the system remained disorganized. Tracking westward, gradual development took place, leading to the Dvorak classification being initiated on July 20. Several hours later, the National Hurricane Center (NHC) designated the system as Tropical Depression Seven-E. A strong ridge situated north of the depression steered the system steadily westward. This movement would remain the same throughout most of the storm's existence. The depression was initially hard to locate due to its large size.

Following an increase in organization, the depression intensified into a tropical storm early on July 22, at which time it was named Gilma. Deep convection developed around the center of circulation throughout the day and banding features became apparent on the west and south sides of the storm. Only 24 hours after becoming a tropical storm, Gilma quickly intensified into a hurricane. This rate of intensification continued throughout most of July 23, resulting in the system attaining Category 4 status on the Saffir–Simpson hurricane scale. By this time, a small, well-defined eye had developed within the center of the hurricane surrounded by very deep convection.

On July 24, the storm crossed 140°W, entering the Central Pacific Hurricane Center's (CPHC) area of responsibility. Upon entering the region, Gilma became the fourth consecutive cyclone to move into the CPHC region. After maintaining this intensity for roughly 12 hours, the storm abruptly weakened. The reason for the sudden weakening is unknown; although the tropical upper tropospheric trough originally located over the storm, providing it with a favorable anticyclonic flow, shifted westward to the International Date Line. Additionally, the storm's eye became obscured by cirrus clouds.

After maintaining Category 3 intensity for 24 hours, the combination of increasing wind shear and degrading outflow, Gilma resumed its weakening trend. Late on July 27, the hurricane weakened to a tropical storm as winds fell below the  threshold. Although weakening, CPHC forecaster Sasaki noted that the storm may have re-intensified slightly shortly after being downgraded. The following morning, the center of Gilma became devoid of convection, exposing the low-level circulation. By this time, the weakening storm began a west-northwesterly track, eventually taking the storm within  of Johnston Atoll late on July 28. Gradual weakening continued to take place throughout the rest of the storm's existence, leading to its downgrade to a tropical depression on July 30. Several hours after being declared a tropical depression, the storm dissipated early on July 31 over open waters south of Midway Atoll.

Impact
The hurricane's only impact was on Johnston Atoll. The island received light rain, wind gusts to near gale force, and some surf. No loss of life or damage was reported. Gilma's name was not retired after the 1994 season, and it was used again in the 2000 and 2006 seasons. However, in 2007, the Central Pacific Hurricane Center requested that the name Gilma, along with 14 other names, be retired as they have become memorable due to the threat of damage. That proposal was not accepted and the name "Gilma" remained on the list for 2012.

See also

List of Category 5 Pacific hurricanes
1994 Pacific hurricane season
Hurricane Emilia (1994) – a similar hurricane that preceded Gilma
Hurricane Walaka (2018)

References

External links

 NHC Preliminary Report
 CPHC Report

1994 Pacific hurricane season
Category 5 Pacific hurricanes